Hearts That Strain is the fourth studio album by English indie rock singer-songwriter Jake Bugg. The album was released on 1 September 2017. Bugg has said: "Albums take you into their own sealed world. This time around I just wanted to write the tunes and record them with great musicians". The album received mixed reviews from critics.

Track listing

Charts

References

2017 albums
Jake Bugg albums
Virgin EMI Records albums